In the field of mathematical analysis for the calculus of variations, Γ-convergence (Gamma-convergence) is a notion of convergence for functionals. It was introduced by Ennio de Giorgi.

Definition
Let  be a topological space and  denote the set of all neighbourhoods of the point .

.

Definition in first-countable spaces
In first-countable spaces, the above definition can be characterized in terms of sequential -convergence in the following way.
Then  are said to -converge to the -limit  if the following two conditions hold:
 
 Upper bound inequality: For every , there is a sequence  converging to  such that
 

The second condition means that this lower bound is optimal.

Relation to Kuratowski convergence

-convergence is connected to the notion of Kuratowski-convergence of sets. Then

 
 

This is the reason why -convergence is sometimes called epi-convergence.

Properties
 -limits are always lower semicontinuous.

Applications
An important use for -convergence is in homogenization theory. It can also be used to rigorously justify the passage from discrete to continuum theories for materials, for example, in elasticity theory.

See also
 Mosco convergence
 Kuratowski convergence
 Epi-convergence

References
 A. Braides: Γ-convergence for beginners. Oxford University Press, 2002.
 G. Dal Maso: An introduction to Γ-convergence. Birkhäuser, Basel 1993.

Calculus of variations
Variational analysis
Convergence (mathematics)